Villardebelle is a commune in the Aude department in southern France.

Population

Sights
 Arboretum de Villardebelle

References

Communes of Aude